Champion, shampion or sampion is a hybrid cultivar of domesticated apple developed c. 1960 in Czech Republic from crossing a Golden Delicious and a Cox Orange Pippin. The fruit has a non-uniform skin color.

See also
 Rajka (apple)

References

CZSO

Photos
Science photo
Age photo stock
Botanik Foto

Scholarly links

1-Methylcyclopropene postharvest treatment and their effect on apple quality during long-term storage time
Virological assessment of stock planting material of apple and raspberry cultivars
Effects of Blackcurrant and Apple Mash Blending on the Phenolics Contents, Antioxidant Capacity, and Colour of Juices
Effects of calcium fertilizer sprays on storage quality of shampion apples

Czech apples
Apple cultivars